Smederevo Hall is an indoor arena in Smederevo, Serbia. It was finished in June 2009, for 2009 Summer Universiade. The hall is located within the SC Smederevo. It is the home arena of domestic KK Smederevo 1953, OK Smederevo Carina, RK Smederevo as well as other sports clubs from Smederevo. In the 2013/2014 season the arena was a home of basketball club KK Mega Vizura, who played in the regional ABA League. Sports Hall has possibilities for various sports events alongside basketball, futsal, volleyball, handball, table tennis and martial arts, there is a bowling alley and indoor shooting range.

See also
 List of indoor arenas in Serbia
 SRC Pools Smederevo

References

External links
 Official website www.halasmederevo.com 
 Official Facebook page www.facebook.com
 Official Twitter profile www.halasmederevo.com

Smederevo
Indoor arenas in Serbia
Basketball venues in Serbia
KK Mega Basket home arenas